Notable people named Treat include:

Given name
 Treat Huey (born 1985), American tennis player
 Treat Baldwin Johnson (1875–1947), American chemist
 Treat Williams (born 1951), American actor

Surname
 Charles H. Treat (1842–1910), American politician, son of Nathaniel Treat
 Cornelius Mortimer Treat (1817–1916), American politician
 Herb Treat ( 1900–1947), American football player
 Howell B. Treat (1833–1912), American Civil War soldier awarded the Medal of Honor
 John Whittier Treat, Professor of East Asian Languages and Literature at Yale University
 Joseph B. Treat (1836–1919), American politician
 Lawrence Treat (1903–1998), American mystery writer
 Mary Treat (1830–1923), American naturalist
 Nathaniel Treat (1798–1894), American politician, father of Charles Treat
 Nathaniel B. Treat (1839–1930), American businessman and politician
 Payson J. Treat (1879–1973), American Japanologist
 Richard Treat (1584–1669), American early settler
 Robert Treat (1622–1710), American politician
 Roger Treat (1906–1969), American writer
 Samuel Treat (1815–1902), American judge from Missouri 
 Samuel Hubbel Treat Jr. (1811–1887), American judge from Illinois
 Sharon Treat (born 1956), American politician and attorney